The 2016–17 Ukrainian Premier League Reserves and Under 19 season are competitions between the reserves of Ukrainian Premier League Clubs and the Under 19s. 

The events in the senior leagues during the 2015–16 season saw Metalurh Zaporizhia Reserves, Hoverla Uzhhorod Reserves, and Metalist Kharkiv Reserves be dissolved with Zirka Kropyvnytskyi Reserves entering the competition.

Standings

Top scorers

See also
2016–17 Ukrainian Premier League

References

External links
Profile at Official UPL Site

Reserves
Ukrainian Premier Reserve League seasons